Alternative Chartbusters may refer to:

 Alternative Chartbusters (Stiff Little Fingers album), 1991
 Alternative Chartbusters (The Boys album), 1978